Trunk 19 is part of the Canadian province of Nova Scotia's system of trunk highways. Most of the route is known as the Ceilidh Trail.

From Port Hastings (near the town of Port Hawkesbury), Trunk 19 follows the western coastline of Cape Breton Island through Judique to the village of Port Hood, where it turns inland to the northeast through Mabou. From Mabou, the route continues back towards the coast at Inverness, then returns inland. At Southwest Margaree, Trunk 19 follows the Margaree River to the end of the road.

Trunk 19 is still referred to locally as Route 19.

Major intersections

References

019
Roads in Inverness County, Nova Scotia